Goodman is an English and Ashkenazi Jewish surname, formerly a polite term of address, used where Mister (Mr.) would be used today. Compare Goodwife. Notable people with the surname include:

People
Abraham Goodman, known as Abby Mann (1927–2008), American film writer and producer
Al Goodman, Ukrainian-American conductor and composer
Alan Goodman, designer for MTV
Albert Goodman, British politician
Alice Goodman, American poet
Alison Goodman, Australian writer
Allegra Goodman, American writer
Alyssa A. Goodman, American astronomer, founding director of the Harvard Initiative in Innovative Computing
Amy Goodman, American broadcast journalist and author
André Goodman, American football player
Andrew Goodman, American civil rights activist
Anthony Goodman (disambiguation), multiple people
Arnold Goodman, Baron Goodman, British lawyer and political adviser
Barbara Goodman, New Zealand politician
Benny Goodman, American jazz clarinetist and band leader
Billy Goodman, American baseball player with the Boston Red Sox
Bobby Goodman, American Army captive in Lebanon
Brian Goodman, American actor
Brian P. Goodman (died 2013), Canadian lawyer
Cameron Goodman, American actress
Carolyn Goodman (psychologist), American civil rights advocate
Carolyn G. Goodman, educator, Las Vegas, Nevada mayor
Charles M. Goodman, American architect
Charles "Rusty" Goodman, American singer and songwriter
Clive Goodman, British royal reporter
David Goodman (disambiguation), multiple people
Dic Goodman (1920–2013), Welsh poet
Dickie Goodman, composer
Dody Goodman, American actress
Don Goodman, English football player
Drew Goodman, American sportscaster
E. Urner Goodman, leader in the Boy Scouts of America
Edmund Goodman, British football manager
Edwin A. Goodman, Canadian politician
Elinor Goodman, British journalist, formerly Political Editor of Channel 4 News
Ellen Goodman, American columnist
Felicitas Goodman, Hungarian linguist and anthropologist
Francis Adam Goodman, German-American politician
Frank Goodman, American theater publicist
Gabriel Goodman, Dean of Westminster
Geoffrey Goodman (1922–2013), English journalist
George Goodman (disambiguation), multiple people
Godfrey Goodman, British Anglican bishop
Helen Goodman, British politician
Henry Goodman, British theater actor
Irwin Goodman, Finnish singer
Ival Goodman, American baseball player for the Cincinnati Reds
Jack Goodman, American politician
James Goodman (disambiguation), multiple people
Jerry Goodman, American violinist
John Goodman (disambiguation), multiple people
Jon Goodman, British footballer
Joseph Goodman (disambiguation), multiple people
Julia Goodman, British portrait painter
Julian Goodman, CEO of NBC
Ken Goodman, educational researcher
Leisa Goodman, Scientologist
Len Goodman, dance judge, best known as a panel member on Strictly Come Dancing
Linda Goodman, American astrologer and poet
Lizbeth Goodman, British academic
Louise Goodman, British television presenter
Mariama Goodman (born 1977), British singer
Mark Goodman, DJ and MTV VJ
Martin Goodman (disambiguation)
Melody Goodman, American biostatistician
Mike Goodman, American professional gambler, pit boss, and author
Morris Goodman (disambiguation)
Murray H. Goodman (born 1925), real estate developer
Nelson Goodman, philosopher
Norman Goodman, American politician
Oscar Goodman, American politician
Paul Goodman (disambiguation), multiple people
Percy Goodman, West Indian cricketer
Pincus Goodman, Yiddish language American poet
Richard Goodman (disambiguation), multiple people
Rick Goodman, video game developer
Roy Goodman (disambiguation), multiple people
Ruth Goodman (born 1961), American romance novelist who wrote as Meagan McKinney
Ruth Goodman (historian) (born 1963), British social historian
Samuel Goodman (disambiguation), multiple people
Saul Goodman (disambiguation), multiple people
Scott Goodman, Australian swimmer
S.G. Goodman, American singer-songwriter
Shirley Goodman, American R&B singer
Steve Goodman, American folk artist 
Steven M. Goodman (born 1957), American conservation biologist
Tamir Goodman, American basketball player
Vestal Goodman, American gospel singer, wife of Howard
Walter Goodman (disambiguation), multiple people
William Goodman (disambiguation), multiple people
 Billy Goodman (1926–1984), baseball infielder
 William Ernest Goodman (1879–1949), American cricketer
 William Meigh Goodman (1847–1928), British Colonial Judge
 Sir William George Toop Goodman known as W. G. T. Goodman (1872–1961), tramways engineer in South Australia

Fictional characters
Cyrus Goodman, Disney Channel’s first gay main character from Andi Mack
Judge Goodman, character from the Judge Dredd comics
Woody Goodman, character in the TV series Veronica Mars
Goodman Brown, protagonist in the short story Young Goodman Brown.
Goodman (NGBC), a fictional boss in Neo Geo Battle Coliseum
Saul Goodman, character from the television series Breaking Bad and Better Call Saul
Detective Goodman, character from the 2020 film The Grudge
Goodman Family, main characters in Channel 4 comedy Friday Night Dinner
Burt Goodman, character from the 2022 television series Severance (TV series)

See also
Gutman, a surname
Guttman, a surname
Guttmann, a surname

English-language surnames
Jewish surnames